PCS may refer to:

Military
 Permanent change of station, to be permanently moved to a new post in the U.S. armed forces
 Personal Clothing System, designation of British Army No. 8 Combat Dress
 Patrol Craft Sweeper, a class of World War II U.S. Navy vessels, including:
 USS PCS-1376, the lead ship of her class
 USS PCS-1379, the fourth of twelve

Organizations
 Communist Party of El Salvador (Partido Comunista de El Salvador), a political party in El Salvador
 Partito Comunista Sammarinese (Sammarinese Communist Party), a former political party in San Marino
 PhillyCarShare, a defunct non-profit organization in Philadelphia, US, acquired by Enterprise in 2011
 Polish Council of State, supreme political body of Poland from 1947 to 1989
 Portland Center Stage, a theater company based in Portland, Oregon, US since 1988
 Potash Corporation of Saskatchewan, a former Canadian producer of potash
 Provincial Civil Service, Uttar Pradesh, India
 Provo Canyon School, a US psychiatric youth residential treatment center
 Public and Commercial Services Union, a trade union representing UK public sector workers

Education
 Pacific Collegiate School, a grades 7–12 charter school in Santa Cruz, California, US
 Petaluma City Schools, the school district of Petaluma, California, US
 Presbyterian Christian School, a private school in Hattiesburg, Mississippi, US
 Professional Children's School, a college preparatory school for child actors and dancers in New York City, US
 Pueblo City Schools, the school district of Pueblo, Colorado, US

Science and technology
 Partitioning Communication System, a high-assurance communications security technology
 Periphere Computer Systeme, a German manufacturer of UNIX-based computers in the 1980s and 1990s
 Personal Communications Service, a set of wireless communications capabilities
 Photon correlation spectroscopy, a spectroscopic technique in chemistry and physics used to determine particle sizes in suspensions
 Physical coding sublayer, an Ethernet Layer 1 (PHY) sub-layer
 Picture communication symbols, drawings used to communicate with autistic people and in other alternative communication systems
 Plastic-clad silica fiber, a type of optical fiber
 Process control system, for industrial process control
 Profile connection space, an intermediary form for color-data used when performing conversions between color spaces

Medicine
 Pelvic congestion syndrome, a cause of chronic pain in the abdomen
 Post-concussion syndrome, a set of symptoms that a person may experience after a concussion
 Post-COVID syndrome, symptoms that develop and continue for a long time after COVID-19
 Postcholecystectomy syndrome, the presence of abdominal symptoms after surgery to remove the gallbladder
 Precordial catch syndrome, a common cause of chest pain complaints in children and adolescents

Other uses
 Pacific Central Station, a railway station in Vancouver, British Columbia, Canada
 Pacific Championship Series, a professional esports league for the MOBA PC game League of Legends
 Photo City Sagamihara, awards for photography given annually by the Japanese town of Sagamihara
 Pinball Construction Set, a computer game by Bill Budge published by Electronic Arts
 Program Component Score, part of the ISU Judging System for figure skating competitions
 Prime Cabinet Secretary of the Republic of Kenya

See also
 Parsec (pc), a unit of distance used in astronomy
 Personal computer (PCs)
 PC (disambiguation)